Mount Cameron is a  triple-summit mountain located within Olympic National Park in Jefferson County of Washington state. Mount Cameron is situated 21 miles southwest of Sequim, and set within the Daniel J. Evans Wilderness. Precipitation runoff from the mountain drains south into the Dosewallips River, north to the Gray Wolf River via Cameron Creek, and west into headwaters of Lost River. Neighbors include line parent Mount Deception,  to the east, and proximate parent Mount Johnson,  to the east.

Etymology

This landform's name was officially adopted in 1969 by the U.S. Board on Geographic Names. This mountain, Cameron Pass, Cameron Glaciers, Cameron Creek, and Cameron Basin are named after Amos Benson Cameron (1872-1951), an early settler of this area who homesteaded for 41 years in the Deer Park area with his wife and 14 children. He pioneered the first trail into Cameron Basin.

Climate

Based on the Köppen climate classification, Mount Cameron is located in the marine west coast climate zone of western North America. Most weather fronts originate in the Pacific Ocean, and travel east toward the Olympic Mountains. As fronts approach, they are forced upward by the peaks of the Olympic Range, causing them to drop their moisture in the form of rain or snowfall (Orographic lift). As a result, the Olympics experience high precipitation, especially during the winter months. This climate supports the Cameron Glaciers on the north slope. During winter months, weather is usually cloudy, but due to high pressure systems over the Pacific Ocean that intensify during summer months, there is often little or no cloud cover during the summer. The months June through September offer the most favorable weather for viewing or climbing this mountain.

Geology

The Olympic Mountains are composed of obducted clastic wedge material and oceanic crust, primarily Eocene sandstone, turbidite, and basaltic oceanic crust. The mountains were sculpted during the Pleistocene era by erosion and glaciers advancing and retreating multiple times.

Gallery

See also

 Olympic Mountains
 Geology of the Pacific Northwest

References

External links

 
 Weather forecast: Mount Cameron
 Amos B. Cameron: biography

Olympic Mountains
Mountains of Washington (state)
Mountains of Jefferson County, Washington
Landforms of Olympic National Park
North American 2000 m summits